Devotion is a compilation album by American alternative rock band Anberlin that was released on October 15, 2013, a year after its predecessor Vital. The album is a rework of the band's sixth studio album, Vital which came out the year before. Devotion is the band's fourth compilation album and tenth overall effort of their career and features the original track-listing of Vital, along with three new self-produced songs: "City Electric", "Dead American", and "IJSW", as well as songs from exclusive releases of Vital for iTunes, Best Buy and the Australian market. The deluxe version contains three discs, disc one being the reworked version of Vital, disc two is a compilation of remixes of the album's songs, while the third disc is a DVD containing a full concert at Music Hall of Williamsburg from mid-2012. The standard edition includes only the reworked "Vital" disc and a CD of the Williamsburg audio. The album was first announced on the band's official website in September 2013, where they revealed they would be releasing "a collection we're calling Devotion: Vital Special Edition".

Track listing

Release history
The band officially released Devotion on October 16, 2013. The album has spawned three new songs. "City Electric", was the first single released on September 24, 2013 and an official lyric video of the single was released on the band's YouTube page the same day.

References

2013 albums
Anberlin albums